Rafael Silva (born March 20, 1985) is a retired Brazilian professional mixed martial artist who competed in the Bantamweight division. A professional competitor since 2005, Silva has competed in his native Brazil for most of his career, but has also multiple bouts in Pancrase, where he was the Bantamweight King of Pancrase, and Bellator MMA.

Background
Silva started training martial arts at the age of 15. His brother Julio Cesar Neves is also a professional mixed martial artist.

Mixed martial arts career

Early career
Silva made his professional MMA debut in June 2005.  After going 2–2 in his first four fights, he maintained an impressive record of 18 wins and only 1 loss from 2009 to 2012. Among his notable wins was a victory over former UFC fighter John Lineker.

A long-time veteran of the national Brazilian MMA scene, Silva fought for a variety of promotions - including World Fighting Combat, Sparta MMA, Octagon MMA, Connect Fight Night, Energy Force, and Nitrix Champion Fight - before making his North American debut.

Bellator MMA
In June 2012, it was announced that Silva had signed with Bellator MMA, although he did not debut until a year later.

Silva entered as a participant in the 2013 Summer Series Bantamweight tournament.  He faced Rodrigo Lima in the semifinals at Bellator 97 and won via submission in the third round.  The finals were delayed until the fall of 2013 and he eventually faced Anthony Leone at Bellator 102.  He won the fight via dominant unanimous decision to earn a title shot.

Silva was booked to face Bantamweight Champion Eduardo Dantas on March 7, 2014, but due to a knee injury, Silva was replaced by Anthony Leone at Bellator 111.

Silva stepped in to replace Eduardo Dantas to face Joe Warren at Bellator 118 on May 2, 2014.  The fight was scheduled for the Bellator Interim Bantamweight championship.  Silva, however, missed weight and the promotion made the interim title available only if Warren were to win. Silva lost the fight via unanimous decision.

Silva faced Rob Emerson on October 3, 2014 at Bellator 127. He won the fight by unanimous decision.

Silva faced Darrion Caldwell at Bellator 137 on May 15, 2015. He lost the fight by unanimous decision.

In June 2015, it was revealed that Silva, along with his brother Julio Cesar and 6 other fighters, were released from the promotion.

Post-Bellator career
Silva returned to the Brazilian circuit and faced Derinaldo Guerra for the vacant Aspera FC Bantamweight title on September 12, 2015, winning the fight by arm-triangle choke in the first round.

After two submission wins in smaller independent organizations, Silva signed with Pancrase.

Pancrase
In his promotional debut Silva faced Shohei Masumizu at Pancrase 276 on March 13, 2016, winning the bout via submission in the first round.

Next he faced Masakatsu Ueda at Pancrase 279 on July 24, 2016. Silva won the bout via unanimous decision.

In his third Pancrase bout Silva faced Victor Henry at Pancrase 282 on November 13, 2016. He won the fight via unanimous decision.

Three straight victories in the promotion aligned Silva to challenge the prevailing Bantamweight King of Pancrase Shintaro Ishiwatari at Pancrase 287 on May 28, 2017. He lost the title fight via unanimous decision.

Later that year, Ishiwatari's title was vacated as he left Pancrase to enter Rizin Bantamweight Grand Prix, leading Silva to rematch Masakatsu Ueda for the interim Bantamweight Championship. The fight eventually happened at Pancrase 296 on May 20, 2018, Silva becoming the interim Bantamweight King of Pancrase via unanimous decision. He was subsequently promoted to undisputed Bantamweight King of Pancrase.

In the first title defense, Silva faced Kenta Takizawa at Pancrase 303 on March 17, 2019. Silva successfully defended the title, winning the fight via submission in the first round.

As the second title defense, Silva faced Yuto Hokamura at Pancrase 307 on July 21, 2019. Silva defended his title again via second round submission win.

ONE Championship
In October 2019, Silva's manager revealed that Silva is no longer under contract with Pancrase, and had signed a one-bout contract with ONE Championship. In his promotional debut, Silva faced Shoko Sato at ONE Championship: Century Part 2 on October 13, 2019. Silva lost the round via technical knockout in the second round.

Silva was then scheduled to face Gabriel Miranda at Brave CF 35 on March 28, 2020. However, the bout was scrapped after the event was postponed to another date due to the COVID-19 pandemic.

Silva was scheduled to have a unification match with Taichi Nakajima at Pancrase 327 in April, 2022, however he suffered a knee injury and retired from MMA.

Championships and accomplishments
Bellator MMA
Bellator 2013 Summer Series Bantamweight Tournament Winner
Pancrase
Pancrase Interim Bantamweight Championship (one time; former)
Pancrase Bantamweight Championship (one time; former)
Two successful title defenses
Aspera Fighting Championship
AFC Bantamweight Championship (one time; former)

Mixed martial arts record

|-
|Loss
|align=center|31–7
|Shoko Sato
|TKO (punches)
|ONE Championship: Century Part 2
|
|align=center|2
|align=center|4:30
|Tokyo, Japan
|
|-
|Win
|align=center|31–6
|Yuto Hokamura
|Submission (head and arm choke)
|Pancrase 307
|
|align=center|2
|align=center|1:54
|Tokyo, Japan
|
|-
|Win
|align=center|30–6
|Kenta Takizawa
|Submission (rear-naked choke)
|Pancrase 303
|
|align=center|1
|align=center|3:12
|Tokyo, Japan
|
|-
|Win
|align=center|29–6
|Masakatsu Ueda
|Decision (unanimous)
|Pancrase 296
|
|align=center|5
|align=center|5:00
|Tokyo, Japan
|
|-
|Loss
|align=center|28–6
|Shintaro Ishiwatari
|Decision (unanimous)
|Pancrase 287
|
|align=center|5
|align=center|5:00
|Tokyo, Japan
|
|-
|Win
|align=center|28–5
|Victor Henry
|Decision (unanimous)
|Pancrase 282
|
|align=center|3
|align=center|5:00
|Tokyo, Japan
|
|-
|Win
|align=center|27–5
|Masakatsu Ueda
|Decision (unanimous)
|Pancrase 279
|
|align=center|3
|align=center|5:00
|Tokyo, Japan
|
|-
|Win
|align=center|26–5
|Shohei Masumizu
|Submission (arm-triangle choke)
|Pancrase 276
|
|align=center|1
|align=center|2:58
|Tokyo, Japan
|
|-
|Win
|align=center|25–5
|Ruben Hernandez Parra
|Submission (arm-triangle choke)
|TBF-The Best Fighter 1
|
|align=center|1
|align=center|1:47
|Praia, Cape Verde
|
|-
|Win
|align=center|24–5
|Jeferson Vieira da Silva
|Submission (armbar)
|XFC i 13
|
|align=center|2
|align=center|1:25
|Sao Paulo, Brazil
|
|-
|Win
|align=center|23–5
|Derinaldo Guerra
|Submission (arm-triangle choke)
|Aspera FC 24
|
|align=center|1
|align=center|4:03
|Sao Jose, Santa Catarina, Brazil
|
|-
|Loss
|align=center|22–5
|Darrion Caldwell
|Decision (unanimous)
|Bellator 137
|
|align=center|3
|align=center|5:00
|Temecula, California, United States
|
|-
| Win
|align=center| 22–4
|Rob Emerson
|Decision (unanimous)
|Bellator 127
|
|align=center|3
|align=center|5:00
|Temecula, California, United States
|
|-
|Loss
|align=center| 21–4
|Joe Warren
|Decision (unanimous)
|Bellator 118
|
|align=center| 5 
|align=center| 5:00
|Atlantic City, New Jersey, United States
|
|-
|Win
|align=center|21–3
|Anthony Leone
|Decision (unanimous)
|Bellator 102
|
|align=center|3
|align=center|5:00
|Visalia, California, United States
|
|-
|Win
|align=center|20–3
|Rodrigo Lima
|Submission (rear-naked choke)
|Bellator 97
|
|align=center|3
|align=center|2:03
|Rio Rancho, New Mexico, United States
|
|-
|Win
|align=center|19–3
|Fabio Selim
|Submission (rear-naked choke)
|Sparta MMA
|
|align=center|3
|align=center|3:01
|Itajaí, Santa Catarina, Brazil
|
|-
|Win
|align=center|18–3
|Luciano Aranha
|TKO (punches)
|Connect Fight Night 2
|
|align=center|1
|align=center|1:56
|Biguacu, Santa Catarina, Brazil
|
|-
|Win
|align=center|17–3
|Mauricio da Silva	
|KO (head kick)
|Energy Force
|
|align=center|1
|align=center|0:07
|Navegantes, Santa Catarina, Brazil
|
|-
|Win
|align=center|16–3
|Saulo Silva
|KO (Superman punch)
|Connect Fight Night 1
|
|align=center|1
|align=center|1:15
|Balneario Camboriu, Santa Catarina, Brazil
|
|-
|Win
|align=center|15–3
|Diego D'Avila	
|TKO (punches)
|Nitrix Champion Fight 10
|
|align=center|1
|align=center|N/A
|Camboriú, Santa Catarina, Brazil
|
|-
|Win
|align=center|14–3
|Wagner Noronha	
|Decision (split)
|Apocalypse Fighting Championship
|
|align=center|3
|align=center|5:00
|Passo Fundo, Rio Grande Do Sul, Brazil
|
|-
|Win
|align=center|13–3
|Fernando Giacometti
|TKO (elbows)
|Octagon MMA
|
|align=center|1
|align=center|1:04
|Itajaí, Santa Catarina, Brazil
|
|-
|Win
|align=center|12–3
|Tiago Silva
|KO (punch)
|Octagon MMA
|
|align=center|1
|align=center|0:52
|Itajaí, Santa Catarina, Brazil
|
|-
|Win
|align=center|11–3
|Jonatan Feitosa
|Submission (rear-naked choke)
|Centurion Mixed Martial Arts 2
|
|align=center|3
|align=center|2:42
|Itajaí, Santa Catarina, Brazil
|
|-
|Win
|align=center|10–3
|Ozeias Costa	
|Decision (unanimous)
|Full Heroes Battle 4
|
|align=center|3
|align=center|5:00
|Paranagua, Paraná, Brazil
|
|-
|Win
|align=center|9–3
|Rogerio Goncalves Menna
|Submission (arm-triangle choke)
|World Fighting Combat: Pretorian
|
|align=center|1
|align=center|2:46
|Pelotas, Rio Grande Do Sul, Brazil
|
|-
|Loss
|align=center|8–3
|Diego D'Avila
|Submission (armbar)
|Nitrix Champion Fight 6
|
|align=center|1
|align=center|4:33
|Brusque, Santa Catarina, Brazil
|
|-
|Win
|align=center|8–2
|Erikson Lima
|Submission (rear-naked choke)
|Centurion Mixed Martial Arts
|
|align=center|1
|align=center|1:38
|Balneario Camboriu, Santa Catarina, Brazil
|
|-
|Win
|align=center|7–2
|Fabio Nunes
|Submission (kimura)
|Colizeu Fight Championship
|
|align=center|1
|align=center|1:02
|Joaçaba, Santa Catarina, Brazil
|
|-
|Win
|align=center|6–2
|Edson da Silva	
|Submission (triangle choke)
|Black Trunk Fight 1
|
|align=center|1
|align=center|N/A
|Florianópolis, Santa Catarina, Brazil
|
|-
|Win
|align=center|5–2
|Joilson Costelinha
|Submission (armbar)
|Nitrix Champion Fight 5
|
|align=center|1
|align=center|4:53
|Balneario Camboriu, Santa Catarina, Brazil
|
|-
|Win
|align=center|4–2
|David Bad Boy
|Submission (rear-naked choke)
|Nitrix Show Fight 4
|
|align=center|1
|align=center|4:40
|Balneario Camboriu, Santa Catarina, Brazil
|
|-
|Win
|align=center|3–2
|John Lineker
|Decision (unanimous)
|Warrior's Challenge 4
|
|align=center|3
|align=center|5:00
|Porto Belo, Santa Catarina, Brazil
|
|-
|Win
|align=center|2–2
|Wagner Mexicano
|TKO (retirement)
|Nitrix Show Fight 3
|
|align=center|2
|align=center|N/A
|Itajaí, Santa Catarina, Brazil
|
|-
|Loss
|align=center|1–2
|Alessandro Cordeiro
|TKO (punches)
|Nitrix Show Fight 2
|
|align=center|2
|align=center|N/A
|Joinville, Santa Catarina, Brazil
|
|-
|Loss
|align=center|1–1
|Marcio Furlin
|Decision (split)
|Floripa Fight 2
|
|align=center|3
|align=center|5:00
|Florianópolis, Santa Catarina, Brazil
|
|-
|Win
|align=center|1–0
|Wallid Wallid
|TKO (punches)
|X-treme Combat
|
|align=center|1
|align=center|2:36
|Brazil
|
|-

References

1985 births
Living people
People from Lages
Brazilian male mixed martial artists
Bantamweight mixed martial artists
Mixed martial artists utilizing Brazilian jiu-jitsu
Brazilian practitioners of Brazilian jiu-jitsu
People awarded a black belt in Brazilian jiu-jitsu
Sportspeople from Santa Catarina (state)